Burnaby is a city in the Lower Mainland region of British Columbia, Canada. Located in the centre of the Burrard Peninsula, it neighbours the City of Vancouver to the west, the District of North Vancouver across the confluence of the Burrard Inlet with its Indian Arm to the north, Port Moody and Coquitlam to the east, New Westminster and Surrey across the Fraser River to the southeast, and Richmond on the Lulu Island to the southwest.

Burnaby was incorporated in 1892 and achieved its city status in 1992. A member municipality of Metro Vancouver, it is British Columbia's third-largest city by population (after Vancouver and Surrey), and is the seat of Metro Vancouver's regional district government. 25% of Burnaby's land is designated as parks and open spaces, one of the highest in North America.

The main campuses of Simon Fraser University and the British Columbia Institute of Technology are located in Burnaby. It is home to high-tech companies such as Ballard Power (fuel cell), Clio (legal software), D-Wave (quantum computing), General Fusion (fusion power), and EA Vancouver. Burnaby's Metropolis at Metrotown is the largest mall in British Columbia, the third most visited in Canada and the fifth largest in the nation. Canada's largest film and television production studio and more than 60% of BC's sound stages are in Burnaby, contributing to the growth of Hollywood North.

The city is served by SkyTrain's Expo Line and Millennium Line. Metrotown station in downtown Metrotown is the busiest station on weekends and the second-busiest on weekdays in regional Vancouver's urban transit system as of 2021.

History

Pre-colonial (before 1850)

Burnaby is located on the ancestral and unceded homelands of hən̓q̓əmin̓əm̓ and Sḵwx̱wú7mesh speaking Coast Salish Nations. Local landmarks such as Burnaby Mountain, Deer Lake, and Brunette River feature prominently in Indigenous history passed down through oral traditions. The northern shorelines of Burnaby, along the second narrows of Burrard Inlet was the site of an ancient battle between the attacking Lekwiltok and the defending Musqueam according to Chief Charlie Qiyəplenəxw.

The Coast Salish people living in BC and Washington state numbered more than 100,000 people, a level of population density supported by agriculture in other geographies. Techniques to preserve and store surplus food sustained a hierarchical society. Burnaby's marshlands along its rivers and lakes were cranberry harvesting areas for numerous villages, some numbering over 1,000 residents. Indigenous people travelled through Burnaby to reach the mouth of Brunette and Fraser River for the bountiful fishing seasons, eulachon in the spring and sockeye salmon in the late summer. Early European explorers and fur traders introduced diseases that decimated the Indigenous population. This false appearance of Burnaby as a vast open space, along with traditional Indigenous farming techniques which did not permanently alter the landscape, meant Indigenous land in Burnaby was mislabelled as terra nullius.

Incorporation (1850–1990)

The Fraser Canyon Gold Rush of 1858, the first of many gold rushes in British Columbia, brought over 30,000 fortune seekers, including many American miners. The fear of an impending annexation by the United States led to the creation of the Colony of British Columbia in 1858 and the establishment of New Westminster as its capital.

Settlers in Burnaby acquired land through a process called pre-emption which allowed people to claim a piece of land by clearing forests and building houses. Indigenous people were excluded from pre-emption. Royal Engineers dispossessed land from Indigenous people with the assistance of military force including the original routes of North Road, Kingsway, Canada Way, and Marine Drive. Logging permits given to settlers destroyed the forests of southern Burnaby which had provided vital sustenance for Indigenous people.

The City of Burnaby is named after Burnaby Lake, in turn named after Robert Burnaby, who was a Freemason, explorer, and legislator. He was previously private secretary to Colonel Richard Moody, the first land commissioner for the Colony of British of Columbia. In 1859, Burnaby surveyed a freshwater lake in the city's geographic centre. Moody named it Burnaby Lake.

Burnaby was established in 1891 and incorporated a year later in 1892. In the same year, the interurban tram connecting Vancouver, Burnaby, and New Westminster began construction.

Recent 

The expanding urban centres of Vancouver and New Westminster influenced the growth of Burnaby. It developed as an agricultural area supplying nearby markets. Later, it evolved into an important transportation corridor between Vancouver, the Fraser Valley and the Interior. The introduction of the Skytrain's Expo Line cemented this trend into the 21st century.

As Vancouver expanded and became a metropolis, Burnaby was one of the first-tier suburbs of Vancouver, along with North Vancouver and Richmond. During the suburbanization of Burnaby, "Mid-Century Vernacular" homes were built by the hundreds to satisfy demand by new residents. The establishment of British Columbia Institute of Technology (BCIT) in 1960 and Simon Fraser University (SFU) in 1965 helped Burnaby gradually become more urban in character. In 1992, one hundred years after its incorporation, Burnaby officially became a city.

Since the 1970s, Burnaby has seen a decline in resource sectors and a subsequent rise of high value-added services and technology sectors. The presence of BCIT and SFU promoted research & development in the area. For example, manufacturing plants near Still Creek closed in the late 1970s, only to reopen few years later as film production studios. The continued expansion of media production in Burnaby contributed to Hollywood North.

Geography and land use

Burnaby occupies  and is located at the geographic centre of the Metro Vancouver Regional District. The city has four areas of urban density known as "town centres": Lougheed, Edmonds, Metrotown, and Brentwood. The city's governmental and cultural precincts are located in Burnaby's Deer Lake area. Situated between the city of Vancouver on the west and Port Moody, Coquitlam, and New Westminster on the east, Burnaby is bounded by Burrard Inlet and the Fraser River on the north and south, respectively. Burnaby, Vancouver and New Westminster collectively occupy the major portion of the Burrard Peninsula. The elevation of Burnaby ranges from sea level to a maximum of  atop Burnaby Mountain. Due to its elevation, the city of Burnaby typically has more snowfall during the winter months than nearby Vancouver or Richmond. Overall, the physical landscape of Burnaby is one of hills, ridges, valleys and an alluvial plain.

Burnaby is home to many industrial and commercial firms. British Columbia's largest (and Canada's second largest) commercial shopping mall, Metropolis at Metrotown, is located in Burnaby, as well as malls in Brentwood and Lougheed town centres. Still, Burnaby's ratio of park land to residents is one of the highest in North America. It also maintains some agricultural land, particularly along the Fraser foreshore flats in the Big Bend neighbourhood along its southern perimeter.

Parks, rivers, and lakes
Major parklands and waterways in Burnaby include Central Park, Robert Burnaby Park, Kensington Park, Burnaby Mountain, Still Creek, the Brunette River, Burnaby Lake, Deer Lake, Squint Lake, and Barnet Marine Park.

Climate

Therefore, climate records are cooler and wetter, with more snowfall, as compared to the rest of the city.

Burnaby has an oceanic climate (Cfb) with mild, dry summers and cool, rainy winters.

Demographics

In 2016, the median age is 40.3 years old, slightly younger than the British Columbia median of 43.0 years old.

Ethnicity 
Similar to the Metro Vancouver region, Burnaby has diverse ethnic and immigrant communities. For example, North Burnaby near Hastings Street has long been home to many Italian restaurants and recreational bocce games. Metrotown's high-rise condominium towers in the south have been fuelled in part by arrivals from China (Hong Kong and Macau) during the 1990s, Taiwan, and South Korea.  According to the 2021 census, ethnic Chinese make up the largest ethnic group of Burnaby with 33.3% while Europeans make up a close 2nd with 30.5%.

Language
According to the 2006 census, 54% of Burnaby residents have a mother tongue that is neither English nor French. The 2016 census found that English was spoken as the mother tongue of 41.33 percent of the population. The next three most common languages were Mandarin (14.53 percent), Cantonese (12.32 percent) and Tagalog (3.35 percent).

Religion 
According to the 2021 census, religious groups in Burnaby included:
Irreligion (118,890 persons or 48.4%)
Christianity (86,490 persons or 35.2%)
Islam (13,735 persons or 5.6%)
Buddhism (9,140 persons or 3.7%)
Hinduism (7,505 persons or 3.1%)
Sikhism (6,905 persons or 2.8%)
Judaism (620 persons or 0.3%)
Indigenous spirituality (130 persons or 0.1%)
Other (2,325 persons or 0.9%)

Industry and economy

The city features major commercial town centres, high-density residential areas, two rapid transit lines, technology research, business parks, film studios such as The Bridge Studios, and TV stations such as Global TV.

Major technology firms such as Ballard Power Systems (fuel cell), D-Wave Systems (quantum computing), Clio (legal tech), Creo (imaging), and Electronic Arts Canada (studio) have their headquarters in Burnaby.

Metropolis mall located in the Metrotown neighbourhood, the downtown area of Burnaby, is the largest mall in British Columbia with West Vancouver's Park Royal in second place. It is the second largest in Canada behind the first-place West Edmonton Mall in Alberta. Metropolis was the second most visited mall in Canada in 2017 and third most visited in 2018.

Heavy industry companies including Chevron Corporation and Petro-Canada petroleum refines oil on the shores of Burrard Inlet.

Best Buy, Ritchie Bros. Auctioneers, Pacific Blue Cross and Nokia have significant facilities in Burnaby.

Other firms with operations based in Burnaby include Canada Wide Media, Doteasy, Telus, Teradici, AFCC, Mercedes-Benz Fuel Cell, HSBC Group Systems Development Centre, and TransLink. eBay ceased local operations in 2009.

Education

Public education
Over 24,000 studentsacross the 41 elementary schools and 8 secondary schoolsare managed by School District 41 in Burnaby. It operates a community and adult education department, an international students program, and a French immersion program.

The British Columbia School for the Deaf is located on the same grounds of the Burnaby South Secondary School.

Higher education
Simon Fraser University's main campus, with more than 30,000 students and 950 staff, is located atop Burnaby Mountain. In Maclean's 2020 rankings, the university placed first in their comprehensive university category, and ninth in their reputation ranking for Canadian universities.

British Columbia Institute of Technology's main campus in Burnaby, home to more than 49,000 full-time and part-time students, was established in 1964. A new $78 million, net-zero emission Health Science Centre, expected to open in late 2021, will accommodate 7,000 students.

Arts and culture
Burnaby is home to multiple museums highlighting the diverse history and culture of the city. Burnaby Village Museum is a  open-air museum preserving a 1920s Canadian village. The Nikkei National Museum & Cultural Centre, which includes a Japanese garden, opened in 2000 to promote awareness and understanding of Japanese Canadian culture. The Museum of Archaeology and Ethnology and SFU Galleries are located within the Simon Fraser University campus at the top of Burnaby Mountain.

Burnaby Public Library was first established in 1954. It currently has four locations throughout the city, including the Bobbie Prittie Metrotown, McGill, Tommy Douglas and Cameron branches in each of the four town centres. The library system holds over three million items in circulation, with more than 5,000 visitors per day.

Many cultural facilities are located in or around Deer Lake Park, including the Burnaby Art Gallery, Shadbolt Centre for the Arts, and the Burnaby Village Museum.

Michael J. Fox Theatre, a community theatre that seats 613, with 11 wheelchair spaces, is situated within Burnaby South Secondary School.

Sports
The city's main stadium, Swangard Stadium, is located in Central Park (Burnaby). It was completed in 1969. The stadium was home to the Vancouver 86ers (now the Vancouver Whitecaps FC) in the Canadian Soccer League from 1986 to 2010, when the team relocated to BC Place to play in the Major League Soccer.

Burnaby Velodrome hosted the National Junior and U17 Track Championship in 2014.

Burnaby was the host for the 2014 IQA Global Games, the second edition of the international quidditch championship.

Transportation

The SkyTrain Operations Controls Centre 1, built in the 1980s, is responsible for the maintenance and operations of both the region's Expo Line and Millennium Line. In 2021, construction began on a $110 million Operations Controls Centre 2 to accommodate growing transit ridership.

The Expo Line, completed in 1986, crosses the south along Kingsway. The Millennium Line, completed in 2002, follows Lougheed Highway. The SkyTrain has encouraged closer connections to New Westminster, Vancouver, and Surrey, as well as dense urban development at Lougheed Town Centre on the city's eastern border, at Brentwood Town Centre in the centre-west, Edmonds–Highgate in the southeast and, most notably, at Metrotown in the south.

Major north–south streets crossing the city include Boundary Road, Willingdon Avenue, Royal Oak Avenue, Kensington Avenue, Sperling Avenue, Gaglardi Way, Cariboo Road, and North Road. East–west routes linking Burnaby's neighbouring cities to each other include Hastings Street, Barnet Highway, the Lougheed Highway, Kingsway (which follows the old horse trail between Vancouver and New Westminster), Canada Way and Marine Drive/Marine Way. Douglas Road, which used to cross the city from northwest to southeast, has largely been absorbed by the Trans-Canada Highway and Canada Way.

The city is served by Metro Vancouver's bus system, run by the Coast Mountain Bus Company, a division of TransLink, the region's transportation authority. The 49 bus route, connecting Metrotown and the University of British Columbia, is the second most boarded bus route after route 99, which is the busiest bus route in North America. Burnaby is also served by the R5 Hastings St RapidBus.

The 2050 Burnaby Transportation Plan, adopted in December 2021, outlines three targets: to reduce traffic fatalities to zero, to increase public transit and active transportation to 75 percent of all trips, and to reduce vehicle emissions by 100 percent.

Politics

While Burnaby occupies about 4 percent of the land area of the Metro Vancouver Regional District, it accounted for about 10 percent of the region's population in 2016. It is the third most populated urban centre in British Columbia (after Vancouver and Surrey), with a population of 249,125 (2021).

Politically, Burnaby has maintained a left-wing city council closely affiliated with the provincial NDP and school board for many years, while sometimes electing more conservative legislators provincially (from the Social Credit and BC Liberal parties) and federally (from the Reform, Alliance, and Conservative parties). Its longest-serving politician had been Svend Robinson of the New Democratic Party (NDP), Canada's first openly gay member of Parliament, but after 25 years and seven elections he resigned his post in early 2004 after stealing and then returning an expensive ring. Burnaby voters endorsed his assistant, Bill Siksay, as his replacement in the 2004 Canadian federal election. In the May 2013 provincial election, residents of the city sent 3 NDP MLAs and one Liberal MLA to the British Columbia legislature. The NDP MLA for Burnaby-Lougheed, Jane Shin, faced controversy after the election for misrepresenting herself as a physician despite not having completed a medical residency nor holding a licence to practice medicine.

According to a 2009 survey by Maclean's magazine, Burnaby was Canada's best-run city. The survey looks at a city's efficiency, the cost of producing results, and the effectiveness of its city services. However, Maclean's did note that Burnaby has one of the worst municipal voter turnouts in the country, at 26 percent. In 2015, the Canadian Federation of Independent Business (CFIB) included Burnaby as a Vancouver periphery to rank eighth for entrepreneurial communities.

Notable people

 Karl Alzner, NHL hockey player
 Glenn Anderson, former NHL hockey player
 Andrea Bang, actor, known for Kim's Convenience
 Michael Bublé, singer
 Christy Clark, former premier of British Columbia
 Kris Chucko, NHL hockey player
 Ian James Corlett, voice actor, writer, and TV producer
 Robin Esrock, South African–born Canadian travel writer, TV host and author
 Michael J. Fox, Canadian-American actor
 Kaleigh Fratkin (born 1992), professional ice hockey player
 Jacob Hoggard, lead singer of Hedley
 Joe Keithley, musician and Burnaby politician
 Braam Jordaan, South African–born entrepreneur, filmmaker, animator, and activist
 Eagle Keys, American-born CFL football player and head coach
 Jason LaBarbera, NHL hockey player
 Brad Loree, movie stuntman
 Kenndal McArdle, former NHL hockey player and investment banker
 John H. McArthur, Harvard Business School dean
 Darren McCarty, NHL hockey player
 Carrie-Anne Moss, movie, television and voice actress
 Dave Nonis, former senior vice president and director of Hockey Operations of the Toronto Maple Leafs
 Ryan Nugent-Hopkins, NHL hockey player
 Mark Olver, NHL and KHL hockey player
 Tyler O'Neill, MLB player for the St. Louis Cardinals
 Buzz Parsons, NASL soccer player and later CSL coach
 Dugald Campbell Patterson, Scottish-born Burnaby pioneer
 Colin Percival, computer scientist
 Dick Phillips, American-born MLB baseball player and PCL team manager
 Roy Radu, Rugby union player
 Svend Robinson, former federal MP, arbitrator/advocate and parliamentary relations consultant
 Cliff Ronning, former NHL hockey player
 Joe Sakic, former NHL hockey player
 Mike Santorelli, NHL hockey player
 Murray SawChuck, Canadian-born Las Vegas-based magician
 Gurv and Harv Sihra, Indian-Canadian professional wrestlers known as Sunil and Samir Singh
 Josh Simpson, USL soccer player
 Christine Sinclair, NWSL soccer player and captain of the Canadian Women's National Soccer Team.
 Don Taylor, Vancouver-area television sportscaster
 Patrick Wiercioch, NHL hockey player
 Greg Zanon, AHL and NHL hockey player

Sister cities
Burnaby has four sister cities:
 Kushiro, Hokkaido, Japan (1965)
 Mesa, Arizona, United States (1998)
 Hwaseong, Gyeonggi-do, South Korea (2010)
 Zhongshan, Guangdong, China (2011)

Notes

References

 Adapted from Home

External links

 
 

 
Cities in British Columbia
Populated places in Greater Vancouver
Populated places established in 1892
1892 establishments in British Columbia